The 1978 Chicago Marathon (also known as the Mayor Daley Marathon) was the 2nd running of the annual marathon race in Chicago, United States and was held on September 24. The elite men's and women's races were won by Americans Mark Stanforth (2:19:20) and Lynae Larson (2:59:25). The race was run in temperatures at times above , which caused hundreds of competitors to need medical attention.

Background
The entry for the 1978 race was increased from $5 the previous year to $10, making it the most expensive US marathon race to enter at the time. The money covered the race organizer's cost of between $200,000 and $250,000 for the race. He had lost $65,000 from the 1977 event. The winners received no prize money, which was not introduced until 1982. 

The start time for the race was 10:30 am, which was 2.5 hours later than the previous year; originally, the proposed start time had been noon, but this was changed after consultation with competitors and the Chicago Area Runners Association. Reasons given for the change included so that more out-of-town competitors could attend, and so to attract more spectators. Many competitors objected to this change, citing issues with the potential for high temperatures, and the medical doctor from the 1977 event also criticized the decision to change the start time. Some competitors wore black armbands to protest the decision.

Race summary
Chicago mayor Michael Anthony Bilandic blamed the lack of fitness of competitors for the health issues. It was estimated that between 9,000 and 10,000 people started the race; the youngest starter was eight years old, and the oldest starters were around 70 years old. Anyone was able to sign up for the event, unlike in the Boston Marathon where competitors had to have previously achieved a qualifying time. The race had two start lines, which allowed competitors to spread out more easily. A total of 4053 runners finished the race, a near doubling from the previous year.

In the men's race, 1977 winner Dan Cloeter led from the start of the race, ahead of a pack of leading racers. Mark Stanforth caught that group,  as they were struggling with the heat more than him, and then caught and passed Cloeter at around the  mark. Cloeter fell behind from Stanforth as he was suffering from cramp in his legs. Stanforth suffered with blisters on his feet in the last few miles, but nevertheless won the race in a time of 2:19:20. He finished over five minutes ahead of Barney Klecker, who finished second, and Cloeter finished third, five seconds behind Klecker. After the race, Stanforth said that the course was too slow, as it had too many corners and too many changes of terrain.

The women's race was won by Lynae Larson, a schoolteacher in Brookings, South Dakota, in a time of 2:59:25. After the race, Larson complained that the delayed start time affected her travel home, as she had to drive six hours back to Brookings to work the next day.

Results

Men 

Source:

Women 

Source:

References

External links 
 Official website
 Results

1978
Chicago
1970s in Chicago
1978 in Illinois
Chicago Marathon
Chicago Marathon